Louise Helen Norton Little ( Langdon; 1894 or 1897 - December 18, 1989) was a Grenadian-born American activist. She was the mother of Malcolm X.

Early years and family 

Louise Norton Langdon Little was born in La Digue, Saint Andrew Parish, Grenada to Ella Langdon in either 1894 or 1897. Ella was the daughter of Jupiter and Mary Jane Langdon, both of whom were kidnapped from the region of modern-day Nigeria and sold into slavery, before being freed by the British Royal Navy; the pair were eventually transported to the Grenadian village of La Digue. It has been claimed that Louise's mother, Ella, one of six children of the Langdons, was raped by a "significantly older" Scotsman named Norton, resulting in Louise's birth.

In later years, Louise's maternal uncle, Egerton Langdon, stated that her father was a bank teller from England. A local historian has suggested that Louise had an older brother, Ruford, who died at only a few years of age.

Little was raised by her grandparents, Jupiter and Mary Jane, until his death in 1901 and hers in 1916. She was educated in a local Anglican school, and was fluent in English, French and Grenadian Creole French. After her grandmother's death, she emigrated from Grenada in 1917 to Montreal, where her uncle Egerton Langdon introduced her to Garveyism and the Universal Negro Improvement Association (UNIA).

Career 
Through the UNIA in Montreal, she met Earl Little, a craftsman and lay minister from Reynolds, Georgia. The couple married on May 10, 1919. The following year they moved to Philadelphia for a better life than they had in Canada, and then to Omaha, Nebraska in 1921. While in Omaha, she became the secretary and "branch reporter" of the UNIA's local chapter, sending news of local UNIA activities, led by Earl, to Negro World; they inculcated self-reliance and black pride in their children. Their son Malcolm, who became famous as Malcolm X, later said that white violence killed four of his father's brothers. Another son, Wilfred, later remembered that Louise "received letters from the leaders of the movement thanking her for the work she had done and praising her for her devotion to the cause". Earl and Louise had seven children together: Wilfred (1920–1998), Hilda (1921–2015), Philbert (1923–1993), Malcolm (1925–1965), Reginald (1927–2001), Wesley (1928–2009) and Yvonne (1929–2003).

Because of Ku Klux Klan threatsEarl's UNIA activities were said to be "spreading trouble"the family relocated in 1926 to Milwaukee, Wisconsin, and shortly thereafter to Lansing, Michigan. There the family was frequently harassed by the Black Legion, a white racist group. When the family home burned in 1929, Earl accused the Black Legion.

In 1931, Earl died in what was officially ruled a streetcar accident, though Louise believed Earl had been murdered by the Black Legion. Rumors that white racists were responsible for Earl's death were widely circulated, and were very disturbing to Louise and their children. After a dispute with creditors, Louise received a life insurance benefit (nominally $1,000about $,000 in  dollars) in payments of $18 per month; the issuer of another, larger policy refused to pay, claiming her husband Earl had committed suicide. To make ends meet Louise rented out part of her garden, and her sons hunted game.

During the 1930s white Seventh-day Adventists witnessed to the Little family; later on Louise Little and her son Wilfred were baptized into the Seventh-day Adventist Church.
In 1937, a man Louise had been datingmarriage had seemed a possibilityvanished from her life when she became pregnant with his child, Robert (1938–1999). In late 1938 she had a nervous breakdown and was committed to Kalamazoo State Hospital. The children were separated and sent to foster homes.

Little was institutionalized at the Kalamazoo Mental Hospital from 1939 through 1963. Malcolm rose to fame as Malcolm X, a leading minister of the Nation of Islamjoined his siblings in securing her release from the hospital. She lived with her surviving family and descendants for the rest of her life mostly in Grand Rapids, Michigan. Most of her children lived and died in Grand Rapids like her where she was a member of Bethel Seventh-Day Adventist Church.

References

Notes

Footnotes

Sources 
 Blain, Keisha N. (February 19, 2017). "On Louise Little, the Mother of Malcolm X: An Interview with Erik S. McDuffie". Black Perspectives. African American Intellectual History Society. Retrieved July 14, 2018. 
Carew, Jan (1994). Ghosts in Our Blood: With Malcolm X in Africa, England and the Caribbean. Chicago: Lawrence Hill Books. p. 118. . 
DeCaro Jr., Louis A. (1996). On the Side of My People: A Religious Life of Malcolm X. New York: New York University Press. pp. 43–44. . 
 McDuffie, Erik S. (Fall 2016). "The Diasporic Journeys of Louise Little: Grassroots Garveyism, the Midwest, and Community Feminism". Women, Gender, and Families of Color. 4 (2): 152. doi:10.5406/womgenfamcol.4.2.0139. 
Malcolm X; with the assistance of Alex Haley (1992) [1965]. The Autobiography of Malcolm X. New York: One World. pp. 3–4. .
"Malcolm X and Seventh-day Adventism". blacksdahistory.org. Retrieved July 25, 2019.
 Marable, Manning (2011). Malcolm X: A Life of Reinvention. New York: Viking. pp. 20–30. .
Natambu, Kofi (2002). The Life and Work of Malcolm X. Indianapolis: Alpha Books. p. 3. . 
Russell, J., Little, H., Jones, S. (2021). The Life of Louise Norton Little. Our Hidden Gem LLC. ISBN  B08XLGGDSP. 
 Perry, Bruce (1991). Malcolm: The Life of a Man Who Changed Black America. Barrytown, N.Y.: Station Hill. pp. 2–3. . 
 Vincent, Ted (March–April 1989). "The Garveyite Parents of Malcolm X". The Black Scholar. 20 (2): 10–13. JSTOR 41067613.
Wurth, Julie (April 7, 2016). "Activist's mom 'stood her ground'". The News-Gazette. Retrieved July 14, 2018.

Further reading 
 

1890s births
1989 deaths
Activists from Michigan
Activists from Nebraska
African-American activists
American people of Nigerian descent
American people of Scottish descent
Converts to Adventism
Grenadian emigrants to Canada
Grenadian emigrants to the United States
Grenadian people of British descent
Grenadian women activists
Malcolm X family
People from Saint Andrew Parish, Grenada
Seventh-day Adventists from Michigan